Iltis was the lead ship of her class of six torpedo boats built for the German Navy (initially called the Reichsmarine and then renamed as the Kriegsmarine in 1935) during the 1920s. The boat made multiple non-intervention patrols during the Spanish Civil War in the late 1930s. During World War II, she did not participate in the Norwegian Campaign of 1940 as she was under repair after having accidentally rammed and sunk a U-boat. Iltis spent the next couple of years escorting minelayers as they laid minefields and laying minefields herself. She also spent the latter half of 1941 escorting convoys through the Skaggerak. The boat returned to France in 1942 and was one of the escorts for the capital ships sailing from France to Germany through the English Channel in the Channel Dash. Iltis then helped to escort one commerce raider through the Channel and was sunk by British forces while escorting another blockade runner in May.

Design and armament
Derived from the preceding Type 23 torpedo boat, the Type 24 was slightly larger and faster, but had a similar armament. Their crew numbered 129 officers and sailors.

As built, the Type 24s mounted three  SK C/28 guns, one forward and two aft of the superstructure, numbered one through three from bow to stern. They carried six above-water 50 cm (19.7 in) torpedo tubes in two triple mounts amidships and could also carry up to 30 mines. After 1931, the torpedo tubes were replaced by  tubes and a pair of  C/30 anti-aircraft guns were added. During the war another pair of 2 cm guns may have been added before her loss.

Construction and career

Iltis was laid down at the Reichsmarinewerft Wilhelmshaven (Navy Yard) on 8 March 1927 as yard number 110, launched on 12 October 1927 and commissioned on 1 October 1928. The boat was initially assigned to the 3rd Torpedo Boat Half-Flotilla and by the end of 1936 she was assigned to the 3rd Torpedo Boat Flotilla. She made several deployments to Spain during the Spanish Civil War. Around June 1938, Iltis was transferred to the 3rd Torpedo Boat Flotilla, shortly before it was renumbered as the 6th Flotilla.

Second World War
Iltis supported the North Sea mining operations that began on 3 September 1939. On 13, 18 and 19 November, the 6th Flotilla and one or two light cruisers met destroyers returning from minelaying missions off the English coast. Two days later the flotilla made another contraband patrol in the Skagerrak before returning to port on the 25th. Iltis accidentally rammed and sank the submarine  on 30 January 1940.

The boat began a refit in Wesermünde shortly afterwards that lasted until May. On 26 July Iltis and her sister, sortied from Stavanger, Norway, to meet with the crippled Gneisenau en route from Trondheim to Kiel for repairs. They rendezvoused with the battleship at 12:45 and an explosion occurred aboard Luchs at 15:49. She broke in half off Jæren and sank with the loss of 102 men. The other escorts made an unsuccessful search for a submarine and rescued the few survivors. The flotilla escorted other minelaying missions in the same area on 31 August – 2 September and 6–7 September. Iltis and Jaguar laid a minefield off Dover on 29–30 October and then again on 2–3 December.

Iltis, the torpedo boat  and the destroyer  were the escorts for a minelaying mission at the northern entrance to the Channel on 23–24 January 1941. Iltis and Jaguar laid a minefield off Eastbourne on 25–26 February and then again on 5–6 March. The pair escorted the battleships  and  into Brest, France on 22 March after their North Atlantic raid. Iltis began a refit the following month at the Wilton-Fijenoord shipyard in Rotterdam, Netherlands, that lasted until June. She was transferred afterwards to the Skagerrak where she was on convoy escort duties until October. The ship was then transferred to France in January 1942, rejoining the 5th Flotilla. They joined the escort force for Scharnhorst, Gneisenau and the heavy cruiser  on 12 February off Cap Gris-Nez during the Channel Dash. The flotilla escorted the commerce raider  through the English Channel from 12 to 19 May. In heavy fighting on the 13th, British motor torpedo boats torpedoed Iltis, which broke in half with the loss of 115 crewmen.

Notes

Notes

References
 

 
 

 

Type 24 torpedo boats
1927 ships
Ships built in Wilhelmshaven